Aurora Borealis is a proposed European research icebreaker, comparable to the world's strongest icebreakers, planned jointly by a consortium of fifteen participant organizations and companies from ten European nations. If built, she would be the largest icebreaker ever built as well as the first icebreaker built to the highest IACS ice class, Polar Class 1.

The unique feature of the proposed vessel is its ability to perform scientific deep sea drilling in a sea ice covered ocean. The ship is proposed to have an operational lifetime of 35 to 40 years, with the main area of operations being the inner Arctic Ocean.

History and background

The planning for the vessel started in 2002. The project is coordinated by the European Polar Board, an expert board of the European Science Foundation.

In March 2007 the BMBF (the German Federal Ministry for Science and Education) funded the preparations for Aurora Borealis, the Helmholtz Association center Alfred Wegener Institute for Polar and Marine Research hosted this project.

In 2010, the German Council of Science and Humanities stopped to support the planning which made the future of the 800-million-euro ship, designed by Schiffko (nowadays Wärtsilä Ship Design), uncertain. The project has been delayed, and a slightly smaller and cheaper (less than 500-million-euro) version, Aurora Slim, has been suggested by the Finnish engineering company Aker Arctic.

Aurora Slim
The most prominent change from Aurora Borealis to Aurora Slim is that the insulated drilling rig is no longer present. She will also have only a single moon pool instead of two as in the original concept.

However, the dynamical positioning system of the smaller vessel consists of three 15MW azimuth thrusters and two 3.5MW bow thrusters instead of three fixed propeller shafts with 27MW propulsion motors and six 4.5MW rectractable transverse thrusters. The number and output of generating sets has also been reduced.

Participants

The participants in the Aurora Borealis project are listed in the following table.

References

External links 
 Focus On AURORA BOREALIS, ESF website
 AURORA BOREALIS, AWI presentation

Proposed ships
Icebreakers
Research vessels